The ngalawa or ungalawa is a traditional, double-outrigger canoe of the Swahili people living in Zanzibar and the Tanzanian coast. It is usually 5–6 m long and has two outriggers, a centrally-placed mast (often inclining slightly towards the prow) and a single triangular sail. It is used for short-distance transport of goods or people, as well as a coastal fishing boat.

The name and the outrigger technology was adapted from the outrigger lakana of the Austronesian Malagasy people of Madagascar.

See also
Outrigger canoe
Trimaran

References

Sailboat types
Outrigger canoes
Indigenous boats
Swahili culture